Atom TV is an American cable television comedy series featuring content from the website Atom.com.  It aired on Comedy Central from June 24, 2008 to October 18, 2010, lasting three seasons and thirty-six episodes. Its timeslot was Monday nights at 2:00 am/1:00c and later 2:30 am/1:30c.

Reception
Common Sense Media rated the show 3 out of 5 stars.

References

External links
 

2000s American sketch comedy television series
2010s American sketch comedy television series
2008 American television series debuts
2010 American television series endings
Comedy Central original programming